Cailee Spaeny (born July 24, 1998) is an American actress. Her first major role was in the science fiction action film Pacific Rim Uprising (2018), which was followed by appearances in Bad Times at the El Royale, On the Basis of Sex, and Vice the same year. She also portrayed the lead of the supernatural horror film The Craft: Legacy (2020). On television, Spaeny was a series regular on the FX science fiction thriller Devs (2020) and the HBO crime drama Mare of Easttown (2021).

Early life and education
Spaeny was born in Springfield, Missouri. Growing up, she spent a large amount of time in the Springfield Little Theatre group, in concert with which she participated in many plays. In the 2014–2015 season, she landed the lead role of Dorothy in The Wizard of Oz.

Career
Her debut film role was as Erica in the 2016 short film Counting to 1000. In 2018, she played several major film roles, starring in Steven S. DeKnight's science fiction monster adventure Pacific Rim Uprising, alongside John Boyega and Scott Eastwood; Drew Goddard's thriller Bad Times at the El Royale; and the biographical dramas On the Basis of Sex and Vice. 

She next appeared in the main cast of the FX miniseries Devs and starred in the film The Craft: Legacy, both in 2020. 

In 2021, she appeared in the HBO limited series Mare of Easttown, a murder mystery, starring Kate Winslet. In September 2022, Spaeny was cast as Priscilla Presley in Sofia Coppola's upcoming film Priscilla alongside Jacob Elordi as Elvis Presley. She was also a top choice to star in a new Alien film for 20th Century Studios.

Filmography

Film

Television

Music videos

References

External links
 
 

1998 births
21st-century American actresses
Actresses from Missouri
American child actresses
American film actresses
American television actresses
Living people
People from Springfield, Missouri